The 2018 Malaysia Cup group stage featured 16 teams and will start on 4 August and concludes on 16 September 2018. A total of 16 teams will compete in the group stage to decide the 8 places in the knockout stage of the 2018 Malaysia Cup.

Draw
The draw for the group stage was held on 30 July 2018, 15:30 MYT (UTC+8), at the Damansara Performing Arts Centre in Petaling Jaya, Selangor and has been broadcast live on iflix and Unifi TV. The 16 teams were drawn into 4 groups. In the group stage, each group was played on a home-and-away round-robin basis. The winners and runners-up of each group advanced to the knockout stage.

Schedule
The schedule of each matchday is as follows.

Groups

Group A

Group B

Group C

Group D

References

External links
Football Malaysia Official Website - (Malaysia Cup)

2018 in Malaysian football
Malaysia Cup seasons